Elizabeth Noelle Reno (born December 25, 1983), known as Noelle Reno, is an American marketing leader, public speaker, and influencer who currently lives in London, United Kingdom.

Early life 
Reno was born in Phoenix, Arizona, to parents Carole Ann Reno and Don Reno, a Special Assistant US Attorney. She was raised in Mercer Island, a suburb of Seattle, Washington. She has a BA in Communications from Regent's College and is a graduate of the Oxford University Blockchain Strategy Programme.

Career 

Noelle is a global digital marketing leader and public speaker. She has led global strategy in-house and in-agency for luxury brands including Four Seasons, The O2 Arena, Diageo, Peroni, London Fashion Week, Bicester Village, Burlington Arcade and BBC World.

Her career began as an international teen model for Elite Model Management. She moved to LA in 2000 after being cast by film director Michael Bay in his Super Bowl ad for Mercedes-Benz S-Class television commercial. In 2004, she began dating the late banking scion and cryptocurrency visionary, Matthew Mellon who backed Reno in her first start up, an upscale leisure line called Degrees of Freedom. sold at Saks Fifth Avenue, Harrods, Harvey Nichols, Nordstrom, Matches Fashion. Reno sold her shares in 2008.

In 2008, Reno partnered with Dame Zandra Rhodes and retailer Harvey Nichols on an innovative retail concept and became a presenter for Fashion TV.

Reno went on to present, blog, and appear in mainstream media, Channel 5 (UK), BBC Four, and Huffington Post. Due to her social influence, she appeared in the first season of Bravo series Ladies of London.

Personal life 
Reno first came to the attention of the press in 2004 as a result of dating Matthew Mellon. Reno called off the engagement to Mellon in 2008. From 2009 - 2014, Reno dated Scot Young. In 2016, she had a son named Xander Maximillian Perks.

References 

American expatriates in England
Living people
1983 births
Participants in American reality television series